Samuel Augustus Merritt (August 15, 1827 – September 8, 1910) was an American politician who served as a California legislator, as a Congressional Delegate from Idaho Territory, and as a judge in Utah Territory.

Born in Staunton, Virginia, Merritt was graduated from Washington College, Lexington, Virginia, in 1848. He moved to Mariposa County, California in 1849, and was county clerk and public administrator in 1850. He served as a member of the California State Assembly in 1851 and 1852, representing Mariposa and Tulare counties. He studied law, and was admitted to the bar in 1852 and commenced practice. He served in the California State Senate 1857–1862. He moved to the Territory of Idaho in 1862.

Merritt was elected as a Democrat to the Forty-second Congress (March 4, 1871 – March 3, 1873); he was an unsuccessful candidate for renomination in 1872. He moved to Salt Lake City, Utah in 1873 and engaged in mining operations and the practice of law. He was city attorney 1888–1890, and served as a member of the Democratic National Committee in 1892. He was chief justice of the supreme court of the Territory of Utah from 1894 to 1896. He died in Salt Lake City at age 83, and was interred in Salt Lake City Cemetery.

References

1827 births
1910 deaths
California state senators
Delegates to the United States House of Representatives from Idaho Territory
Members of the California State Assembly
People from Mariposa County, California
Politicians from Salt Lake City
Politicians from Staunton, Virginia
Washington and Lee University alumni
Utah Territorial judges
Utah Democrats
Burials at Salt Lake City Cemetery
County clerks in California
Idaho Democrats
19th-century American politicians
Chief Justices of the Utah Supreme Court
19th-century American judges